Alta Loma School District is a K-8 school district in San Bernardino County, California that covers Rancho Cucamonga. It was established in 1885 and currently serves approximately 6,800 students. The district feeds into Chaffey Joint Union High School District.

Schools

Elementary schools
Alta Loma Elementary School 
Banyan Elementary School
Carnelian Elementary School
Deer Canyon Elementary School
Hermosa Elementary School
Jasper Elementary School
Stork Elementary School
Victoria Groves Elementary School

Junior high schools
Alta Loma Junior High School
Vineyard Junior High School

References

External links
 

School districts in San Bernardino County, California
School districts established in 1885
1885 establishments in California